Queen Jezebel is a 1953 historical novel by Jean Plaidy first published by Robert Hale in the UK.

It portrays the last years of Queen Catherine de' Medici, including the St. Bartholomew's Day massacre; the title alludes to the infamous biblical queen Jezebel, for being lewd and cruel.

References

1953 British novels
British historical novels
Novels set in France
Novels about royalty
Cultural depictions of Catherine de' Medici
Fiction set in the 1570s
Novels set in the 16th century
Robert Hale books